Loukas Notaras (5 April 1402 – 3 June 1453) was a Byzantine statesman who served as the last megas doux or grand Duke (commander-in-chief of the Byzantine navy) and the last mesazon (chief minister) of the Byzantine Empire, under emperors John VIII Palaiologos and Constantine XI Palaiologos.

Biography
Loukas Notaras was descended from a Greek family originally from Monemvasia; his earliest ancestor whom we can identify in the surviving sources was one sebastos Paul, who captured the island of Kythera from the Venetians for the Emperor Michael VIII Palaiologos in 1270. Other members of the Notarades can be identified over the following decades. In the middle of the 14th century one branch relocated to Constantinople, where they rose to political and social prominence by supporting Andronikos IV Palaiologos, who was rebelling against his father John V Palaiologos, and then, after Andronikos's death, by supporting his son John VII Palaiologos.

Loukas Notaras' father was Nicholas Notaras, a wealthy merchant in Galata, who served as envoy to emperor Manuel II Palaiologos in Italy, France, and England; he held the citizenships of Genoa and Venice. His mother's name was Euprepeia. Little is known of her, other than that she died before 1412, and was buried in the Xanthopoulon Monastery in Constantinople. Loukas had at least one brother, John, who served as epi tes trapezes, was captured in a skirmish during the 1411 siege of Constantinople and decapitated. Nicholas ransomed his son's head and buried it with the rest of his remains in a public funeral.

In 1424, Notaras was one of three emissaries—along with Manuel Melachrenos and George Sphrantzes—who negotiated a treaty of friendship between Emperor John VII Palaiologos and Sultan Murad II of the Ottoman Turks at the end of the Ottoman Interregnum. His continued importance as an imperial official is attested by his presence at the marriage of the future Emperor Constantine XI Palaiologos to Caterina Gattilusio 27 July 1441.

The famous phrase "I would rather see a Turkish turban in the midst of the City (i.e., Constantinople) than the Latin mitre" is attributed to him by Doukas, but although it does reflect the views of the party hostile to the Union of the Churches established by the Council of Florence, the attribution to Notaras is probably wrong. Indeed, Notaras worked with his emperor Constantine XI to secure Catholic aid by whatever avenues they could find while simultaneously attempting to avoid riots by the Orthodox faithful. Unfortunately for his memory, this pragmatic middle course led to his vilification by both sides of the debate, attacks which were not lessened by the intense politicking going on among the late Imperial hierarchy. Constantine's close friend and personal secretary George Sphrantzes, for instance, seldom has a charitable word for Notaras and Sphrantzes' antipathy was repeated in turn by Edward Gibbon.

Fall of Constantinople 
During the 1453 siege of Constantinople, Notaras led the troops along the north-western Sea Wall. Some accounts of the siege have him deserting his post after the Ottoman banner was raised on the tower above the Kerkoporta, but this may have been politically motivated slander. In any case, he was able to hold the Sea Wall—which had been the point of entry of all earlier successful attacks on the city—against the Turks until the breach of the land walls rendered his efforts moot.

Death 
Notaras, his Palaiologos wife and his son were all captured by the Turks and originally granted clemency in the name of reestablishing order and in exchange for much of Notaras's fortune, which he had the sense to invest abroad in Venice in the form of dowries for his children. Nonetheless, he was executed shortly after along with his son and son-in-law. This may have simply been due to the Sultan rethinking the wisdom of allowing a noble with ties to the Vatican and Venice to live; Gibbon believes he was caught already in the middle of such intrigue.

According to Makarios Melissenos, known as "Pseudo Sphrantzes", who wrote an unreliable (probably apocryphal) eyewitness account of the Fall of Constantinople, Mehmed's final words to Notaras before he ordered his execution:

Family 
The widow of Notaras, who was on her sickbed during the final Ottoman assault, died a slave along the way to Adrianople, the former Ottoman capital; she was buried near the village of Mesene. Two members of Notaras' family were on the passenger list of a Genoese ship that escaped the fall of the city. His daughter Anna became the focal point of the Byzantine expatriate community in Venice. Two other daughters, Helena Notaras and Theodora Notaras, also survived the fall and joined their sister in exile. Helena Notaras (who later took the monastic name of Euphrosyne) had married the heir to Ainos, Giorgio Gattilusio in 1444.

Writings 
A collection of Lucas Notaras's letters in Latin has been published in Greece under the title Epistulae. It includes Ad Theodorum Carystenum, Scholario, Eidem, Ad eundem and Sancto magistro Gennadio Scholario. He figures as a character in the book Johannes Angelos by the Finnish author Mika Waltari (1952, Eng. translation The Dark Angel, 1953). In the novel he is depicted as leader of a group of Byzantine nobles who vainly try to collaborate with the enemy after the fall of Constantinople.

In popular culture 

 In the 1951 Turkish film, İstanbul'un Fethi, Notaras was played by Vedat Örfi Bengü.   
In the 1952 historical novel, Johannes Angelos by  Mika Waltari
 In the 2012 Turkish film, Fetih 1453, Notaras was played by Naci Adıgüzel.
 In the 2019 historical novel, Porphyry and Ash.
 In the 2020 historical fiction docuseries Rise of Empires: Ottoman was played by Osman Sonant.

References and notes

Sources 
 
"Le rachat des Notaras apres la chute de Constantinople ou les relations 'étrangères' de l'élite Byzantine au XVe siecle", by Thierry Ganchou, in Migrations et diasporas méditerranéennes (Xe-XVIe siecles), Paris 2002.
 

 
 
 
 

1402 births
1453 deaths
15th-century Byzantine military personnel
Executed Byzantine people
Byzantine officials
15th-century Greek people
15th-century executions by the Ottoman Empire
Byzantine people of the Byzantine–Ottoman wars
Year of birth unknown
People executed by the Ottoman Empire by decapitation
Byzantine letter writers
Fall of Constantinople
Megaloi doukes
Monemvasia